Pselliogyra is a genus of sea snails, marine gastropod mollusks in the family Pyramidellidae, the pyrams and their allies.

This genus is now included in the genus Parthenina Bucquoy, Dautzenberg & Dollfus, 1883

Species
Species within the genus Pselliogyra include:
 Pselliogyra pagodula (A. Adams, 1860): synonym of Parthenina pagodula (A. Adams, 1860)
 Pselliogyra sagamiana (Yokoyama, 1922): synonym of Parthenina sagamiana (Yokoyama, 1922)
 Pselliogyra varia Odé, 1993: synonym of Parthenina varia (Odé, 1993)

References

External links
 To World Register of Marine Species

Pyramidellidae